Carl Björk (born 19 January 2000) is a Swedish professional footballer who plays as a forward for Danish Superliga club Brøndby IF.

Club career

Umeå IK
Björk started his career at IFK Holmsund/Sandviks IK. After spells at Umeå IK and IFK Umeå, he joined Umeå FC at the age of 13 in 2013. Björk made his debut for Umeå FC's first team in the Swedish Division 1 on 10 July 2016 in a 1–1 draw against Nyköpings BIS, where he came on the pitch in the 85th minute.

IFK Norrköping
At the age of 16, he moved from his parents' home in Umeå to Norrköping, where he joined IFK Norrköping in July 2016. He spent the 2017 to 2019 seasons on loan at IF Sylvia. Ahead of the 2019 season, Björk was promoted to IFK Norrköping's first team. Björk made his Allsvenskan debut on 14 June 2020 in a 2–1 win over Kalmar FF.

In August 2020, Björk was loaned out to Trelleborgs FF on a deal for the remainder of the 2020 season. After returning to IFK Norrköping for 2021, he established himself as a key player for the team, scoring eight goals in 27 appearances throughout the season.

Brøndby
On 30 January 2022 it was confirmed that Björk had joined Danish Superliga club Brøndby IF on a deal until June 2026. He made his competitive debut for the club on 20 February, featuring in the starting line-up of a 2–0 league victory against Nordsjælland. He strained his hamstring during the spring, sidelining him for several months.

Career statistics

References

2000 births
Living people
Swedish footballers
Swedish expatriate footballers
Association football forwards
Sweden youth international footballers
Umeå FC players
IF Sylvia players
IFK Norrköping players
Trelleborgs FF players
Brøndby IF players
Ettan Fotboll players
Division 2 (Swedish football) players
Allsvenskan players
Superettan players
Danish Superliga players
Swedish expatriate sportspeople in Denmark
Expatriate men's footballers in Denmark
Sportspeople from Umeå